Miss Indonesia is a national beauty pageant in Indonesia, organized by MNC Group under Miss Indonesia Organization, chaired by Liliana Tanoesoedibjo and sponsored by Sariayu Martha Tilaar. The winner of Miss Indonesia represents the country in Miss World pageant, one of the Big Four international beauty pageants and participates in various social actions in cooperation with Yayasan Jalinan Kasih, MNC Peduli and Miss World Organization program, Beauty with a Purpose.

The current Miss Indonesia is Audrey Vanessa Susilo of North Sulawesi who was crowned by Pricilia Carla Yules of South Sulawesi on 15 September 2022. She will represent Indonesia at Miss World 2022.

History 

Miss Indonesia Organization together with Puteri Indonesia Organization is widely supported by the President and Cabinet of the Republic of Indonesia. In 2019, Joko Widodo announced the Miss Indonesia and Puteri Indonesia as the "National Intangible Cultural Heritage of Indonesia", which carries the values of Indonesian culture and society togetherness, to celebrate the role of women in the creative industry, environment, tourism, education and social awareness. In line with that, Angela Tanoesoedibjo the eldest daughter of media magnate MNC Group Hary Tanoesoedibjo and Miss Indonesia President and Chief Executive Officer Liliana Tanaja Tanoesoedibjo chosen as The Deputy of Ministry of tourism and Creative Economy of The Republic of Indonesia by the President of Indonesia, Joko Widodo at the Istana Negara Palace in Central Jakarta.

In 2005, the Miss Indonesia org. was established, is a national beauty pageant in Indonesia, organized by their own media company MNC Group under Miss Indonesia Organization, chaired by the Indonesian Business conglomerate, Media tycoon and Politician Hary Tanoesoedibjo wife - Liliana Tanaja Tanoesoedibjo  and sponsored by Sariayu Martha Tilaar. The winner of Miss Indonesia represents the country in Miss World pageant, one of the Big Four international beauty pageants and participates in various social actions in cooperation with Yayasan Jalinan Kasih, MNC Peduli and Miss World Organization program, Beauty with a Purpose. The first Miss Indonesia to compete at Miss World beauty pageant is the former Indonesian National Armed Forces Reservist and United States Army Nurse Corps, Kristania Virginia Besouw who competed in Miss World 2006 in Palace of Culture and Science, Warsaw, Poland.

Selection process
In order to represent her province at the National Finals, each delegate must go through an audition process conducted in major cities of Indonesia. Each year, a total of 34 delegates are selected to participate at the final round, one from each province.

Titleholders 
In 2005, the Miss Indonesia winner for the first time competed at the Miss ASEAN pageant, where the second edition was held in Jakarta, Indonesia and placed as the 1st Runner-up. In 2006, Miss Indonesia lost the franchise of the Miss ASEAN pageant and repositioned as Miss World Indonesia to represent Indonesia at the Miss World pageant. On occasions, when the winner does not qualify (due to age) for either contest, a runner-up is sent.

The winner of the contest receives the title Miss Indonesia and is eligible to represent Indonesia in the Miss World pageant. Miss Indonesia wears a crown of white gold with swarovski, presented by Untung Bersama Sejahtera (UBS Gold) since 2009.

In 2016, UBS Gold introduced the new Miss Indonesia crown model. The philosophy of the crown is Beauty with a Purpose that Miss Indonesia joins hands with the weak and children to make the world better.

In 2020, Miss Indonesia and UBS Gold again introduced the new Miss Indonesia crown model entitled "Spirit of Indonesia". The crown consists of a frame made of white gold, encrusted with swarovski zirconia to give it a red accent. The combination of red and white symbolizes Indonesia. This new crown is expected to bring fighting spirit to Indonesian women in the global arena.

Gallery of winners

Number of wins by province

International representations
Color key

Placements at International Pageants

The following are the placements of Miss Indonesia titleholders for their participation at international pageants throughout the years.

 10 Placements at Miss World (2011-2021). The highest placements are Maria Harfanti and Natasha Mannuela Halim as 2nd Runner-up Miss World 2015 and 2016 
 1 Placement at Miss ASEAN (2005). The highest placement is Imelda Fransisca as 1st Runner-up Miss ASEAN 2015

Controversy 
In recent years, there has been criticism that some participants do not come from, and have never even set foot in, the area they represent. This is because Miss Indonesia auditions are generally held only in major cities, so not all regions can be represented. Potential participants may hold a sash from particular province, although they have no connection with that province.

Miss World Indonesia Before 2006

See also

Miss World
Puteri Indonesia
Puteri Indonesia Lingkungan
Puteri Indonesia Pariwisata
Miss Earth Indonesia
Miss Grand Indonesia
Indonesia at major beauty pageants

References

External links
  

 
Beauty pageants in Indonesia
Indonesian awards
Recurring events established in 1965